Liability may refer to:

Law 
 Legal liability, in both civil and criminal law
 Public liability, part of the law of tort which focuses on civil wrongs
 Product liability, the area of law in which manufacturers, distributors, suppliers, retailers, and others who make products available to the public are held responsible for the injuries those products cause
 Professional liability for one's professional acts, as in professional liability insurance

Finance 
 Liability (financial accounting) a current obligation of an entity arising from past transactions or events
 Accrued liabilities and contingent liability
 Current liability, or short-term liabilities are obligations that will be settled by current assets or by the creation of new current liabilities
 Non-current, or Long-term liabilities, liabilities with a future benefit over a certain period of time (e.g. longer than one year)

Arts and media

Film
 The Liability, a 2013 film

Music
 Liability (album), a 2015 album by Prof
 "Liability" (song), a song by Lorde from the 2017 album Melodrama
 "Liability", a song by Carly Pearce from the 2021 album 29: Written in Stone
 "Liability", a song by Drake from the 2022 album Honestly, Nevermind
 "Liability", a song by Fufanu from the 2017 album Sports
 "Liability", a song by Raleigh Ritchie from the 2016 EP Mind the Gap
 "Liability", a song by The Juliana Theory from the 2001 EP Music from Another Room